Ogren Park at Allegiance Field is a stadium in Missoula, Montana. It is primarily used for baseball, and is the home field of the Missoula PaddleHeads of the Pioneer League. Built in 2004, it seats 3,500 people. The park replaced Lindbord-Cregg Field.

On July 3, 2012, 4,316 people attended a game between the Missoula Osprey and the Billings Mustangs at the facility, a venue record.

Notable performers
Other uses for the stadium include concerts and plays. Some of the most notable performers at Ogren Park include:

Dierks Bentley - July 4, 2008
Steve Martin - July 20, 2012
Mumford & Sons - August 11, 2019

References

External links
Ogren Park at Allegiance Field - Missoula PaddleHeads
Ogren Park at Allegiance Field Views - Ball Parks of the Minor Leagues
Financial support to build the park comes from Play Ball Missoula

Baseball venues in Montana
Sports venues in Missoula, Montana
2004 establishments in Montana
Sports venues completed in 2004